John of Katavas (Greek: Ιωάννης Καταβάς) was a feudal lord and regent in the Principality of Achaea.

He was one of the feudatories of Geoffrey of Briel, the Baron of Karytaina. He fought against the Byzantines in the battle of Prinitza in 1263.

References

Sources

13th-century people from the Principality of Achaea